Mike Harrington is an American programmer and businessman. He is the co-founder of the video game company Valve. After the success of the first Valve product, Half-Life (1998), Harrington left Valve in 2000. In 2006, he co-founded the photo editing service Picnik.

Career
Harrington was a game programmer at Dynamix and a designer on the Windows NT operating system at Microsoft. In 1996, Harrington founded Valve with Gabe Newell, another former Microsoft employee.

Harrington and Newell funded the development of Valve's debut product, Half-Life (1998), which Harrington also helped program. He said: "At Microsoft you always wonder, 'Is it me being successful or is it Microsoft?' But with Half-Life I knew Gabe and I had built that product and company from scratch." On January 15, 2000, Harrington dissolved his partnership with Newell and left Valve to spend time with his wife. According to Newell, Harrington did not want to risk another project after the success of Half-Life.

In 2006, Harrington co-founded the photo editing service Picnik with friend and former colleague Darrin Massena. Picnik was acquired by Google in March 2010. Harrington left Google in March 2011. In January 2012, he co-founded another company with Massena, Catnip Labs. Harrington was the CTO at the Committee for Children from 2016 to 2018. Harrington served as CTO of Amplion from November 2018 until March 2020.

References

External links

Living people
American computer businesspeople
Place of birth missing (living people)
Year of birth missing (living people)
American video game programmers
Google employees
Microsoft employees
Valve Corporation people
American technology company founders